A Vaportight tank is a horizontal, atmospheric, crude oil storage tank.

Design 
Vaportight tanks can hold up to 14.7 PSI and use that pressure to force gas vapors to a flare stack. Because Vaportight tanks allow no fugitive gas to escape they are classified as process equipment, therefore they can be spaced as such and are secondary containment exempt. This also allows them to be operated in situations with a high H2S content.

Vaportight tanks also known as (Tornado type tanks, Positive Pressure Systems, and OSY Tanks) are frequently packaged with an integral separator package, flare stack, and all other equipment downstream of the wellhead to form a complete single well battery. Because of this Vaportight tank packages are a mostly used in the temporary production of oil wells.

Uses 
The intended use for Vaportight tank packages was sour oil production (as H2S gas is deadly in low concentrations) but with ease. The first vaportight tanks were constructed from used crude oil rail tankers by Tornado Technologies. Today's Vaportights are manufactured tanks which makes them a much lighter, easier to move alternative with more storage capacity.

References

Storage tanks